Giannis Georgaras (born 4 November 1956) is a Greek football manager.

References

1956 births
Living people
Greek football managers
Ethnikos Asteras F.C. managers
Apollon Smyrnis F.C. managers
Aiolikos F.C. managers
Greek expatriate sportspeople in Cyprus
Footballers from Athens
Greek footballers